Alex Rodriguez Park at Mark Light Field is home field for the Miami Hurricanes baseball team at the University of Miami in Coral Gables, Florida. The stadium holds a capacity of 5,000 spectators and is located on the University of Miami's campus in Coral Gables. The first game on the field was held on February 16, 1973. 

The field is named for Mark Light, whose father, University of Miami fan George Light, donated money for its construction. Mark Light died of muscular dystrophy. and the field was dedicated in his honor in 1977.

Following a $3.9 million contribution by New York Yankees all-star Alex Rodriguez, the facility was renovated from 2007–09 and renamed.

In 2013, the Hurricanes ranked 26th nationally among Division I baseball programs in attendance, averaging 2,635 per home game.

Since 1973, the University of Miami has been one of college baseball's elite with 25 College World Series appearances, winning four national championships (1982, 1985, 1999, and 2001) and advancing to the NCAA regionals a record 44 consecutive years. Miami has won 29 NCAA Regional Titles, hosted 27 NCAA Regionals, and in each of their four national championship runs they were an NCAA Regional Host.

See also
 List of NCAA Division I baseball venues

References

External links
Official website

University of Miami
Miami Hurricanes baseball
Baseball venues in Florida
College baseball venues in the United States
1973 establishments in Florida
Sports venues completed in 1973